Menegazzia norsorediata is a species of lichen from South America. It was described as new to science in 1996.

See also
List of Menegazzia species

References

norsorediata
Lichen species
Lichens described in 1996
Lichens of South America